John Symes Berkeley (1663–1736) of Stoke Gifford near Bristol was an English Member of Parliament.

He was born the second son of Richard Berkeley of Stoke Gifford and inherited the family estates on the death of his elder brother in 1685, including Stoke Park. He later exploited the rich coal deposits beneath the estate and commissioned Sir James Thornhill to rebuild a summerhouse at the end of the terrace of Stoke Park House as an orangery.

He was twice elected to represent the constituency of Gloucestershire in the Parliament between 1710 and 1715.

He died at Bath in 1736 and was buried at Stoke Gifford. He had married twice; firstly in 1695, Susan, the daughter and heiress of Sir Thomas Fowles and the widow of Jonathan Cope and secondly in 1717, Elizabeth, the daughter and coheiress of Walter Norborne of Calne, Wiltshire and widow of Edward Devereux, 8th Viscount Hereford, with whom he had a son, Norborne Berkeley, 4th Baron Botetourt, a future Governor of Virginia and a daughter, Elizabeth, who married Lord Charles Somerset. On Norborne's death in Virginia, Stoke Park House passed to Elizabeth and became a Dower House of the Beauforts.

References 

1663 births
1736 deaths
Members of the Parliament of Great Britain for Gloucestershire
British MPs 1710–1713
British MPs 1713–1715